Paul Wolfisberg (15 June 1933 – 24 August 2020) was a Swiss football player and coach.

Biography
Born in 1933 in Horw, Wolfisberg first played for FC Horw before joining FC Luzern at the age of 17. In 1954, he joined FC Biel-Bienne while studying at the Technicum in Biel/Bienne. He returned to Luzern in 1955 after being recruited by coach Rudi Gutendorf. In 1960, he won the Swiss Cup as captain of FC Luzern. He retired as a footballer in 1966.

In 1966, Wolfisberg became manager of SC Buochs, which led the Swiss Challenge League in 1972. After temporarily leaving his post, he returned in December 1972 for the second round. He returned to FC Luzern in 1975 as co-manager alongside Josef Vogel, replacing Ilijas Pašić and was soon replaced by Otto Luttrop. He returned to coaching in October 1975, leading SC Kriens, where he succeeded the late Egon Milder. He was relieved of his coaching duties in 1977 but was retained as a technical director of the club. In 1978, he became technical director at FC Luzern, which led the Swiss Super League in 1979.

In 1981, Wolfisberg was appointed head coach of the Switzerland national team, leading 52 matches until 1985, when he was axed following a failure to qualify for the 1986 FIFA World Cup. In 1989, he supported Uli Stielike as head of the National Team.

Wolfisberg died at his home in Horw on 24 August 2020 at the age of 87.

References

External links
 

1933 births
2020 deaths
People from Lucerne-Land District
Swiss men's footballers
Association football forwards
FC Luzern players
FC Biel-Bienne players
Swiss Super League players
Swiss football managers
FC Luzern managers
SC Kriens managers
Switzerland national football team managers
Sportspeople from the canton of Lucerne